The Meghalaya Legislative Assembly election of 2013 was held on 23 February 2013 to elect the Members of the Legislative Assembly (MLA) from each of the 60 Assembly Constituencies (ACs) in the state of Meghalaya in India.

Background 
The 8th Meghalaya Legislative Assembly was formed after Meghalaya Legislative Assembly election in 2008 and this assembly is to expire on 10 March 2013. Hence the new election to the 9th Meghalaya Legislative Assembly is announced by the Election Commission of India.

After the scrutiny of the nomination by the candidates, 345 candidates were able to contest in polls in which 320 men and 25 women.

Results

Elected Members

References 

2013 State Assembly elections in India
State Assembly elections in Meghalaya
2010s in Meghalaya
9th Meghalaya Legislative Assembly